L’Aubette is an historical building on Place Kléber in Strasbourg, France. It was built by Jacques-François Blondel in 1765–1772. In 1926, three avant-garde artists Theo van Doesburg, Sophie Taeuber-Arp and Jean Arp (or Hans Arp) were commissioned by Paul and Adré Horn to redecorate and design the Café Aubette in Strasbourg. Three artists were equally responsible for different sections of the building. Theo van Doesburg was in charge of the two cafés and two dance halls, Sophie Taeuber for the entrance aisle, tearoom, and two bars, and Jean Arp for the basement, the passage, and billiard room. And all three artists worked together designing the stairwell. The work of the three artists had been called "the Sistine Chapel of abstract art". This historical building still opens as a historical landmark nowadays.

History before 1920 
L'Aubette originated from a monastic complex in the thirteenth century. Most of the construction collapsed in the sixteenth century and the remaining parts were used for a military purpose. In the eighteenth century, in order to underline and reflect the contemporary French style, Blondel was commissioned to re-build the remnants on Place Kléber, and it was then that the new building, L’Aubette (firstly named as Obet), was created. The new building continued to serve as a military garrison for a long time thereafter. In the mid-nineteenth century, the main purpose of the building changed and L’Aubette started to be used for education and entertainment. However, in 1870, the building was destroyed by a fire. Only the complex's façade built by Blondel survived. L’Aubette didn't receive much attention and was ignored until the 1920s.

Redecoration in 1920s 
In the 1920s, the lessees of L’Aubette, brothers Paul and André Horn, commissioned Theo van Doesburg, Sophie Taeuber-Arp, and Jean Arp to transform the interior of the building to meet contemporary needs and give it a bold, modern look. Past artistic experience and background inspired the artists’ contributions on the design of l'Aubette. As the pioneer of Dutch De Stijl movement, Theo van Doesburg employed his perspective on elementarism and the neo-plastic style to decorate the ceiling and wall of cinema-ballroom with orthogonal composition in primary colors. Sophie Taeuber-Arp and Jean Arp, two Zurich Dada artists, utilized their aesthetic dadaist ideology to challenge the conventions of architecture. Three artists together focused explicitly on developing the relationship between the architecture and human body movements, putting the viewer into an abstract world. As the experiencer Emmy Ball-Hennings described after visiting:"The interior arrangement was by Sophie Taeuber, who painted the house with Jean Arp and Theo van Doesburg. The walls, covered with paintings, give the illusion of almost endlessly vast rooms. Here painting makes the visitor dream, it awakens the depths in us. The house may become a treasure box, a reliquary, and one can always look at it with new eyes. And since the image itself does not change, it is the spectator who lets himself be transformed by the image. It is like owning the lamp 30 with which Aladdin lighted the marvelous cave."

Current Aubette 
Nowadays, Aubette is an artistic and historical landmark with free admission on Place Kléber, which is enjoyed by many tourists. It has three major rooms opened to the public. The facility includes the theater, gallery, and café.

References

External links 
L'Aubette 1928 on the official websites of the Municipal museums of Strasbourg

Monuments historiques of Strasbourg